This was the first edition of the tournament.

Sixth-seeded Ruxandra Dragomir won in the final 7–6, 6–1 against Melanie Schnell.

Seeds
A champion seed is indicated in bold text while text in italics indicates the round in which that seed was eliminated.

  Julie Halard-Decugis (quarterfinals)
  Sabine Hack (second round)
  Elena Makarova (second round)
  Ann Grossman (first round)
  Katarína Studeníková (second round)
  Ruxandra Dragomir (champion)
  Elena Pampoulova (semifinals)
  Tami Whitlinger-Jones (second round)

Draw

References

External links
 1996 Budapest Lotto Open draw

Budapest Grand Prix
Singles